Si Amil Island is a Malaysian island located in the Celebes Sea on the state of Sabah. Si Amil Island is situated northeast of Danawan Island.

See also
 List of islands of Malaysia

References

Islands of Sabah
Volcanoes of Malaysia